Events from the year 1411 in France

Incumbents
 Monarch – Charles VI

Events
 June 4 - Charles VI grants a monopoly for the ripening of Roquefort cheese to the people of Roquefort-sur-Soulzon.

Births
 Unknown - Isabella of Brittany (died 1444)

Deaths
 July 15 - Jean Petit, theologian (born 1360)

References

1410s in France